Suffolk Bank was a private clearinghouse bank in Boston, Massachusetts, that exchanged specie or locally backed bank notes for notes from country banks to which city-dwellers could not easily travel to redeem notes. The bank was issued its corporate charter on February 10, 1818 by the 38th Massachusetts General Court to a group of the Boston Associates (including Patrick Tracy Jackson and Daniel Pinckney Parker), and the charter's holders and bank's directors met periodically from February 27 to March 19 at the Boston Exchange Coffee House to discuss the organization of the bank. On April 1, 1818, the bank opened for business in rented offices on State Street until the bank moved permanently to the corner of State and Kilby Streets (currently occupied by either 75 State Street or Exchange Place) on April 17. In addition to Jackson and Parker, other prominent shareholders of the bank included William Appleton, Nathan Appleton, Timothy Bigelow, John Brooks, Gardiner Greene, Henry Hubbard, Augustine Heard, Amos Lawrence, Abbott Lawrence, Luther Lawrence, William Prescott, Dudley Leavitt Pickman, and Benjamin Seaver.

The bank operated by redeeming country banks' notes at par value, so long as the banks maintained an account with Suffolk Bank. To qualify for such an account, a bank was required to remit a starting deposit of $2,000 or more, and—in the case of banks not located in Boston—to maintain a sufficient balance to redeem any of the banks' notes that Suffolk Bank might receive for redemption. Beginning in 1824, "all of the banks in Boston, with the exception of the New England [a competing clearinghouse bank], agreed to make the Suffolk Bank their agent for the redemption of bills of outside banks." The Suffolk Bank enabled member banks to deposit notes from other banks at par value, and to be credited for these deposits within one business day. The bank operated in this manner until the Bank of Mutual Redemption was organized in 1858 and assumed this role for all of New England. Following passage of the National Bank Act of 1864, the Suffolk Bank was reorganized and renamed as the Suffolk National Bank on January 1, 1865, and continued to operate as a national bank until it merged in 1902 with the Washington National Bank to form the National Suffolk Bank which was liquidated in 1903.

In his History of Money and Banking in the United States, Murray Rothbard credits the Suffolk Bank with exercising "a stabilizing influence on the New England economy." John Jay Knox Jr., a former Comptroller of the U.S. Treasury, stated that the success of the Suffolk Bank demonstrated that:

the fact is established that private enterprise could be entrusted with the work of redeeming the circulating notes of the banks, and it could thus be done as safely and much more economically than the same service can be performed by the Government.

See also 

 History of central banking in the United States#1837–1862: "Free Banking" Era
 Federal Reserve System
 New York Clearing House Association
 Suffolk System

Notes

External links 
 Suffolk Bank Records at Baker Library Historical Collections, Harvard Business School

Banks based in Massachusetts
1858 disestablishments in Massachusetts
Companies based in Boston
Defunct banks of the United States
Banks established in 1818
Defunct companies based in Massachusetts
Banks disestablished in 1858
1818 establishments in Massachusetts